The 2020–21 Lincoln City F.C. season is the club's 137th season in their history and the second consecutive season in EFL League One, Along with League One, the club will also participate in the FA Cup, EFL Cup and EFL Trophy.

The season covers the period from 1 July 2020 to 30 June 2021.

Pre-season

Competitions

EFL League One

League table

Results summary

Results by matchday

Matches
On 21 August 2020 the EFL League One fixtures were revealed.

Play-offs

FA Cup

The first round draw was made on 26 October 2020. The second round draw was made on the 9 November 2020, by former Lincoln City manager Danny Cowley.

EFL Cup

The first round draw was made on 18 August. The draw for both the second and third round were confirmed on September 6, live on Sky Sports by Phil Babb.

EFL Trophy

The regional group stage draw was confirmed on 18 August. The second round draw was made by Matt Murray on 20 November, at St Andrew’s. The third round was made on 10 December 2020 by Jon Parkin. The Quarter Final draw was made on 23 January 2021 by Sam Parkin. The Semi Final draw was made on 5 February 2021 by Adebayo Akinfenwa.

Transfers and contracts

Transfers in

Transfers out

Loans in

Loans out

New contracts

Squad statistics

Appearances 

|-
|colspan="12" style="text-align:center;" |Players no longer at the club

|}

References

Lincoln City
Lincoln City F.C. seasons